This is a list of the extreme points of England: the points that are farther north, south, east or west than any other location, as well as the highest and lowest points.

England (including islands)
 Northernmost point – Marshall Meadows Bay, Northumberland at 
 Northernmost settlement – Marshall Meadows, Northumberland at 
 Southernmost point – Pednathise Head, Western Rocks at 
 Southernmost settlement – St Agnes, Isles of Scilly at 
 Westernmost point – Crim Rocks, Isles of Scilly at 
 Westernmost settlement – St Agnes, Isles of Scilly at 
 Easternmost point – Lowestoft Ness, Suffolk at 
 Easternmost settlement – Lowestoft, Suffolk at

England (mainland)
 Northernmost point – Marshall Meadows Bay, Northumberland at 
 Northernmost settlement – Marshall Meadows, Northumberland at 
 Southernmost point – Lizard Point, Cornwall at 
 Southernmost settlement – Lizard, Cornwall at 
 Westernmost point – Land's End, Cornwall at 
 Westernmost settlement – Sennen Cove, Cornwall at 
 Easternmost point – Lowestoft Ness, Suffolk at 
 Easternmost settlement – Lowestoft, Suffolk at 
 Highest point – Scafell Pike, Cumbria.
 Lowest point – Holme Fen, Cambridgeshire.

See also 
 Extreme points of the United Kingdom
 Extreme points of Europe
 Extreme points of Earth
 Geography of England

Lists of coordinates
England
Extreme